BlankOn Linux is a Debian-based Linux distribution designed and adapted to the needs of general computer users in Indonesia. This distribution was developed by the BlankOn Development Team with support from the Indonesian Linux Mobilization Foundation (YPLI) since 2004.

Mission
The goal of developing the BlankOn Linux distribution is to produce a Linux distribution that is suitable for the needs of general computer users in Indonesia, especially for the world of education, offices, and government. BlankOn was developed with multimedia support such as MP3, VCD, and DVD.

BlankOn is designed with a graphic display and theme that displays Indonesian characteristics. The development of BlankOn will continue to be done openly to the public. This development activity is expected to result in the release of BlankOn once or twice a year.

In April 2021, BlankOn 12 Beta was released to the public.

References

2004 software
Computer-related introductions in 2004
Free software operating systems
Linux distributions
Debian-based distributions
X86-64 Linux distributions
State-sponsored Linux distributions